The Citizenship and Migration Board (CMB) was a government agency in Estonia under the Ministry of Internal Affairs that was in charge of enforcing regulations concerning immigration and nationality. In 2010, it was merged with other agencies and formed Police and Border Guard Board.

Issuance of travel documents
The CMB was the authority which issued the following Estonian travel documents:

Estonian passport
Estonian alien's passport
Estonian identity card

Processing of nationality applications
The CMB was responsible for processing applications and enquiries concerning Estonian citizenship.

Immigration control
The CMB was responsible for enforcing visa/residence permit regulations and for processing asylum/refugee requests.

References

Specialist law enforcement agencies of Estonia
1993 establishments in Estonia